Nikolskoye is a rural locality (a village) in Miyakinsky Selsoviet, Miyakinsky District, Bashkortostan, Russia. The population was 59 as of 2010. There is 1 street.

Geography 
Nikolskoye is located 9 km southeast of Kirgiz-Miyaki (the district's administrative centre) by road. Anyasevo is the nearest rural locality.

References 

Rural localities in Miyakinsky District